Luc Leestemaker (May 18, 1957 – May 18, 2012) was an American abstract expressionist artist who was born in Hilversum, the Netherlands.

Leestemaker was born in Hilversum and raised in Nuenen (Noord-Brabant). In Eindhoven he started the Dutch art collective "Hart Poetry" with his fellows Bart Op het Veld en Mat Verberkt. Together with them he also founded the PR-agency Trains in Eindhoven. After dissoliving both the collective and the agency he went to Amsterdam where he headed Leestemaker & Associates, an Amsterdam-based consulting firm specializing in the arts.

Biography 
Upon moving to the U.S. in 1990, Leestemaker committed himself to painting full-time. His early influences included the CoBrA movement, abstract expressionism, inner landscape and transfiguration, and 17th and 18th century Dutch and English landscape painters, including John Constable and Salomon van Ruysdael.

In 2006, Canadian composer Vincent Ho (Composer in Residence at the Winnipeg Symphony Orchestra) used four paintings of the artist for a chamber music work in four parts, titled "Four Paintings by Leestemaker." Funded by the Canadian Arts Council, this work was performed at a number of music festivals throughout China. The video artist and animator Edber Mamesao choreographed a 20-minute visual interpretation of this composition and a DVD version of this compilation as part of a hardcover book about the artist's life and work. In September 2007, his  "Breaking Through the Canvas" premiered at the Pasadena Museum of California Art.

He died of cancer on May 18, 2012, his 55th birthday.

Mature works 

Leestemaker's paintings are exhibited throughout the U.S. and internationally. Two retrospective museum exhibitions were held in 2004. Boston Galerie d'Orsay hosted an exhibition with a selection of the museum works for the artist in 2005. The documentary "Swimming Through the Clouds", about the artist's life and work, was screened at a number of film festivals around the world and broadcast by Link TV, a culture and arts satellite network.

His work is featured in corporate and public collections, including Bakersfield Museum of Art, Bellagio Hotel & Casino in Las Vegas, Estrella-Banner Medical Campus in Phoenix, Four Seasons Hotel in the Bahamas, Genzyme International in Boston, Harvard University at the Offices of Neuro-Science Department, Las Vegas International Airport, Miramax Films, Mitsubishi-Shiodome Project in Tokyo, 20th Century Fox Film Corporation, Toyota USA Headquarters in Torrance, and Iris A. Walsh Foundation in Winnipeg.

The artist collaborated with composer and musician Charlie Haden and created the artwork for Haden's 2005 Grammy award-winning CD Land of the Sun.

His collaboration with Hollywood's film industry has led to a number of film and television projects, including Spider-Man, Bringing Down the House, Erin Brockovich, Simone, Shopgirl, American Dreamz, Spider-Man 3, Fracture,  and Boston Legal.

In 2010, Skylark Press published The Intentional Artist: Stories of My Life, a series of essays by the artist with an overview of paintings that span 20 years.

Other books published include:
 Luc Leestemaker, Paintings 1990–2000 SWC Editions, 2000.
 Luc Leestemaker; Landscapes SWC Editions, 2002
 Luc Leestemaker; The Voyage Skylark Press, 2007.

Bibliography 
Film Documentaries
Swimming through the Clouds; A Portrait of the Artist Luc Leestemaker, directed by Terence Gross and Ruy Carpenter. Chronicle Films, 2004.
A Conversation with Luc Leestemaker.' Directed by Emily Lau. Skylark Press, 2007.

Related RecordingsFour Paintings by Leestemaker'' by Vincent Ho. Commissioned by The Royal Conservatory of Music, Canada.

Self-titled debut CD by composer Vincent Ho. Skylark Press, 2007.
 Collective consciousness 
 New Music Festival Features Four Paintings by Leestemaker

References

External links

1957 births
2012 deaths
20th-century Dutch painters
Dutch male painters
20th-century American painters
American male painters
21st-century American painters
21st-century American male artists
Abstract expressionist artists
Dutch emigrants to the United States
Modern painters
People from Hilversum
Painters from Amsterdam
Artists from Los Angeles
20th-century American male artists
20th-century Dutch male artists